The women's freestyle 51 kilograms is a competition featured at the 2006 World Wrestling Championships, and was held at the Tianhe Gymnasium in Guangzhou, China on 30 September 2006.

This freestyle wrestling competition consists of a single-elimination tournament, with a repechage used to determine the winner of two bronze medals.

Results
Legend
F — Won by fall
WO — Won by walkover

Final

Top half

Bottom half

Repechage

References

Women's freestyle 51 kg